The 1939 Montana State Bobcats football team was an American football team that represented Montana State College (later renamed Montana State University) in the Rocky Mountain Conference (RMC) during the 1939 college football season. In its 10th season under head coach Schubert R. Dyche, the team compiled a 2–7 record.

Schedule

References

Montana State
Montana State Bobcats football seasons
Montana State Bobcats football